Mohnish Dinesh Mishra (born 9 February 1984) is an Indian cricketer. He is a right-handed batsman and a right-arm off-break bowler. He was banned from Indian cricket due to his signing with the rebel ICL. Subsequently, Mishra left the ICL and, following an amnesty offer from BCCI, returned to Indian domestic cricket.

A middle-order batsman, Mishra made his first-class cricket debut for Madhya Pradesh against Railways in 2000/01 at the age of 16. However, he played just two games in that season. He also represented India at the ICC Under-19 World Cup in 2002. But then he went through a period of four years without competitive cricket as he failed to impress the selectors of his state team. He made a comeback during the 2005/06 season, but his domestic career was cut short after he signed up with the Delhi Giants team in the now-defunct Indian Cricket League. Eventually the BCCI revoked its ban on the ICL players and Mishra returned to playing for his state team in 2009 and has been a regular member of the playing XI ever since. He signed up for Deccan Chargers in 2010. Mishra went on to play 11 matches for them that season. He had a highly successful first-class season in 2010/11 as he accumulated 718 runs in 9 matches at an average of 59.83. In 2011, he signed a contract with the new IPL franchise Pune Warriors India.

He was suspended on 15 May 2012 for spot-fixing issue, after a local news channel, India TV reportedly accused him along with four other players based on a sting operation. After the corruption probe in June, Mishra was handed a one-year ban for bringing the game into disrepute while his Madhya Pradesh teammate TP Sudhindra was given a life-ban after he was found guilty of the charges.

References

External links
 
 Yahoo! Cricket Profile : Mohnish Mishra

Indian cricketers
Pune Warriors India cricketers
Deccan Chargers cricketers
Central Zone cricketers
Madhya Pradesh cricketers
India Green cricketers
India Red cricketers
Living people
1984 births
Cricketers banned for corruption